The growth-hormone-releasing hormone receptor (GHRHR) is a G-protein-coupled receptor that binds growth hormone-releasing hormone. The GHRHR activates a Gs protein that causes a cascade of cAMP via adenylate cyclase.

Function 

This gene, expressed in the pituitary, encodes a receptor for growth-hormone-releasing hormone. Binding of this hormone to the receptor leads to synthesis and release of growth hormone. Mutations in this gene have been associated with isolated growth-hormone deficiency (IGHD), also known as Dwarfism of Sindh, a disorder characterized by short stature. Many alternate transcriptional splice variants encoding different isoforms have been described, but only two have been characterized to date.

Ligands

Agonists 
 CJC-1295
 Dumorelin
 GHRH (somatorelin)
 Rismorelin
 Sermorelin
 Tesamorelin

Antagonists 
 MZ-5-156

References

Further reading

External links 
IUPHAR GPCR Database – GHRH receptor
 

G protein-coupled receptors